Greatest Hits - The Ultimate Video Collection is a DVD by rock band Bon Jovi, coinciding with the bands Greatest Hits compilation. It contains 17 of the band's most popular music videos and 17 corresponding live versions of those songs taken from various concerts. The majority of the live performances have previously been released on DVD.

The DVD is presented in 16x9 "Pillarbox" format and contain stereo and Dolby Digital 5.1 Surround sound audio.

Track listing

Music Videos
 "Livin' on a Prayer"
 "You Give Love a Bad Name"
 "In These Arms"
 "Bad Medicine" (2nd version)
 "Born to Be My Baby"
 "I'll Be There for You"
 "Lay Your Hands on Me"
 "It's My Life"
 "Always" (Band-only version/Single Edit)
 "Wanted Dead or Alive"
 "Bed of Roses"
 "Who Says You Can't Go Home"
 "Have a Nice Day"
 "We Weren't Born to Follow"
 "What Do You Got?"
 "Keep the Faith"
 "Blaze of Glory"

Live Performances
 "Livin' on a Prayer" (from Live at Madison Square Garden)
 "You Give Love a Bad Name" (from Live from London)
 "In These Arms" (from Live at Madison Square Garden)
 "Bad Medicine" (from Live from London)
 "Born to Be My Baby" (from This Left Feels Right Live)
 "I'll Be There for You" (from The Crush Tour)
 "Lay Your Hands on Me" (from This Left Feels Right Live)
 "It's My Life" (from Live at Madison Square Garden)
 "Always" (from Live at Madison Square Garden)
 "Wanted Dead or Alive" (from Lost Highway: The Concert)
 "Bed of Roses" (from This Left Feels Right Live)
 "Who Says You Can't Go Home" (from Lost Highway: The Concert)
 "Have a Nice Day" (from Live at Madison Square Garden)
 "We Weren't Born to Follow" (Live from London O2 Rooftop Gig)
 "What Do You Got?" (Live from Peru)
 "Keep the Faith" (from Live from London)
 "Blaze of Glory" (from Live at Madison Square Garden)

Technical Notes
The DVD is presented in 16:9 widescreen format.

The DVD has two audio tracks: Dolby Digital 2.0 Stereo and Dolby Digital 5.1 Surround Sound.

Charts and certifications

Peak positions

Year-end charts

Certifications

References

Bon Jovi video albums
2010 video albums
2010 greatest hits albums
Live video albums
Music video compilation albums